Charles Morley (27 November 1847 – 27 October 1917), was a British Liberal Party politician.

Background
He was part of a family of Liberal politicians; he was the third son of Samuel Morley MP, and older brother to the Rt Hon. Arnold Morley MP. One of his older brothers was the businessman Baron Hollenden. He was educated at Trinity College, Cambridge (BA 1870; MA 1874).

Career
He was Honorary Secretary to the Royal College of Music. He was a partner in the firm of Messrs I. and R. Morley, of Wood Street, London. He was a Justice of the Peace for Berkshire and Somerset.

Political career
He was Liberal candidate for the Somerset East Division at the 1892 General Election but was unable to gain the seat from the Liberal Unionist.
He was Liberal candidate for the Breconshire Division at the 1895 General Election in succession to the retiring Liberal MP, William Fuller-Maitland. The constituency had returned Liberals at every election since 1875 and Morley had no trouble holding the seat;

At the 1900 General Election he was re-elected at Breconshire, unopposed.
He retired from parliament just before the 1906 General Election.

Election results

References

1847 births
1917 deaths
Liberal Party (UK) MPs for Welsh constituencies
UK MPs 1895–1900
UK MPs 1900–1906
Alumni of Trinity College, Cambridge